Two ships of the Royal Navy have been named HMS Gardenia :

  an  sloop launched in 1917 and sold in 1923
 , a  launched in 1940 and sunk in 1942

Royal Navy ship names